Holmes Chapel railway station serves the village of Holmes Chapel in Cheshire, England. The station is 8½ miles (14 km) north east of Crewe on the Crewe to Manchester Line.

Facilities
The station has a ticket office on the southbound platform, which is staffed six days a week on a part-time basis (Monday - Friday 06:35 - 13:05, Saturday 07:35 - 13:55).  Outside these hours, tickets must be bought in advance or on the train.  There are two waiting shelters on the northbound platform and a waiting room in the main building; canopies are also provided for passengers for use when the booking office is closed.  Train running information is offered via digital displays, timetable posters and a customer help point on platform 1.  Step-free access is available to both platforms.

There is a Lending library in the station waiting room.

Services
During the daytime on Monday to Saturday there are two trains per hour to Crewe southbound and two per hour to Manchester Piccadilly northbound (though not at even intervals). One journey goes via Stockport (calling at all intermediate stations) and the other via Manchester Airport (omits certain stops) and extends to Liverpool Lime Street. There is an hourly service during the evening in each direction via Stockport.

On Sundays there is an hourly service in each direction (via Stockport) to Manchester Piccadilly northbound.  Services are operated by Northern Trains.

References

Further reading

External links

 Times Article of 15 September 2007 on Holmes Chapel Station Book Club
 Crewe-Manchester Community Rail Partnership

Railway stations in Cheshire
DfT Category E stations
Former London and North Western Railway stations
Railway stations in Great Britain opened in 1842
Northern franchise railway stations